Friberg is a Swedish surname. Notable people with the surname include:

 Adam Friberg (born 1991), Swedish Pro Gamer, known for Ninjas In Pyjamas
 Arnold Friberg (1913–2010), American artist, noted for his religious work
 Bernie Friberg (1899–1958), baseball player
 Daniel Friberg (born 1978), Swedish businessman, publisher, and writer
 Eino Friberg (1901–1995), Finnish-American writer
 Louise Edlind Friberg (born 1946), Swedish actress and politician
Richard Friberg, Swedish economist
Ulf Friberg (born 1962), Swedish actor and film director
 Wilhelm Friberg (1865–1932), Swedish football manager

See also
 Freiberg (disambiguation)
 Freiburg (disambiguation)
 Freyberg
 Freyburg (disambiguation)
 Friberg Township, Minnesota
 Fribourg (disambiguation)

Swedish-language surnames